General elections were held in Liechtenstein on 2 February 1997. The result was a victory for the Patriotic Union, which won 13 of the 25 seats in the Landtag. Voter turnout was 86.8%.

Results

References

Liechtenstein
1997 in Liechtenstein
Elections in Liechtenstein
February 1997 events in Europe